The 2012 season was Helsingin Jalkapalloklubi's 104th competitive season. HJK is the most successful Finnish football club with 25 Finnish Championships, 11 Finnish Cup titles, 4 Finnish League Cup titles and one appearance in the UEFA Champions League Group Stages.

Season events
On 30 October, HJK announced the singing of Mikael Forssell to a two-year contract, commencing 1 January 2013.

New contracts
On 9 November, Sebastian Mannström signed a new two-year contract with HJK, with Sebastian Sorsa signing a similar deal on 19 November.

Squad

Out on loan

Transfers

In

 Transfer announced on the above date, being finalised on 1 January 2013.

Loans in

Loans out

Competitions

Veikkausliiga

Results summary

Results

League table

Finnish Cup

League Cup

Group 2

Knockout stages

UEFA Champions League

Qualifying phase

UEFA Europa League

Play-off

Squad statistics

Appearances and goals

|-
|colspan="14"|Players from Klubi-04 who appeared:

|-
|colspan="14"|Players away from the club on loan:

|-
|colspan="14"|Trialists:

|-
|colspan="14"|Players who left the club during the season:
|}

Goal scorers

Clean sheets

Disciplinary Record

References

2012
Hjk